Group 3 of the UEFA Women's Euro 2017 qualifying competition consisted of five teams: France, Ukraine, Romania, Greece, and Albania. The composition of the eight groups in the qualifying group stage was decided by the draw held on 20 April 2015.

The group was played in home-and-away round-robin format. The group winners qualified directly for the final tournament, while the runners-up also qualified directly if they were one of the six best runners-up among all eight groups (not counting results against the fifth-placed team); otherwise, the runners-up advance to the play-offs.

Standings

Matches
Times are CEST (UTC+2) for dates between 29 March and 24 October 2015 and between 27 March and 29 October 2016, for other dates times are CET (UTC+1).

Goalscorers
8 goals

 Eugénie Le Sommer

5 goals

 Daryna Apanaschenko

4 goals

 Clarisse Le Bihan
 Ștefania Vătafu

3 goals

 Marie-Laure Delie
 Kheira Hamraoui

2 goals

 Élise Bussaglia
 Jessica Houara
 Amel Majri
 Danai-Eleni Sidira
 Adina Giurgiu
 Alexandra Lunca
 Andreea Voicu
 Olha Boychenko

1 goal

 Saranda Hashani
 Kujtime Kurbogaj
 Furtuna Velaj
 Camille Abily
 Charlotte Bilbault
 Sophia Koggouli
 Vasso Kydonaki
 Eleni Markou
 Dimitra Panteliadou
 Veatriki Sarri
 Mara Bâtea
 Andreea Corduneanu
 Cosmina Dușa
 Maria Ficzay
 Lidia Havriștiuc
 Laura Rus
 Florentina Spânu
 Iya Andrushchak
 Yana Kalinina
 Tetyana Kozyrenko
 Darya Kravets
 Olha Ovdiychuk
 Tetyana Romanenko

1 own goal

 Arbiona Bajraktari (playing against Ukraine)
 Marigona Zani (playing against Greece)
 Darya Kravets (playing against Greece)
 Iryna Vasylyuk (playing against France)

References

External links
Standings, UEFA.com

Group 3